Barbulifer is a genus of gobies native to the tropical Atlantic coast of the Americas as well as the Gulf of California on the Pacific coast.

Species
There are currently five recognized species in this genus:
 Barbulifer antennatus J. E. Böhlke & C. R. Robins, 1968 (Barbulifer)
 Barbulifer ceuthoecus (D. S. Jordan & C. H. Gilbert, 1884) (Bearded goby)
 Barbulifer enigmaticus Joyeux, Van Tassell & Macieira, 2009 (Goateed goby)
 Barbulifer mexicanus Hoese & Larson, 1985 (Saddlebanded goby)
 Barbulifer pantherinus (Pellegrin, 1901) (Panther goby)

References

Gobiidae